The Security Council of Armenia is the highest decision-making defence and law enforcement body in the Republic of Armenia. The offices of the Security Council is located on 24 Marshal Baghramyan Avenue in Yerevan.

History

On 22 November 1991, President Levon Ter-Petrosyan appointed Ashot Manucharyan as Senior Advisor to the President on national security. On 13 December 1991, the National Security Council (NSC) attached to the Presidency was founded by decree. Following the 2005 constitutional amendments, article 55 of the Constitution of Armenia foresaw the formation of the Armenian NSC attached to the Presidency and having a consultative status. On 29 February 2008, Artur Baghdasaryan announced that he had accepted the post of Secretary of the National Security Council as part of a planned coalition government with then President-elect Serzh Sargsyan. The post of Secretary of the National Security Council was previously considered to be primarily ceremonial, with the council seldom meeting. With the election of Prime Minister Sargsyan to the presidency, with Sargsyan himself having formerly headed the council, the council became more active, giving newly appointed Secretary Baghdasaryan the opportunity "to get fully involved in the governance of our country." On 7 March 2018, the National Assembly adopted the law "About the Formation of the SC and Its Activity".

Functions
The Security Council defines main defense policy directions, as well as approves development plans for the Armed Forces of Armenia and other militarized forces. It also, at the suggestion of the Prime Minister of Armenia, discusses matters relating to the security and territorial integrity of Armenia.

The Office of the Security Council ensures:

 The organization of preparatory works for Security Council sessions
 Working out of proposals on Security Council sessions
 Collection of information on security threats to the Republic 
 Monitoring and preparation of reports
 Supervision over the execution of assignments

Members
Members of the Security Council include:

Prime Minister/Chairman of the Security Council – Nikol Pashinyan
Deputy Prime Minister – Hambardzum Matevosyan
Deputy Prime Minister – Mher Grigoryan
Secretary – Armen Grigoryan
Minister of Defence – Suren Papikyan
Minister of Foreign Affairs – Ararat Mirzoyan
Directory of the National Security Service – Armen Abazyan
Chief of the Police of Armenia – Vahe Ghazaryan
Chief of the General Staff – Artak Davtyan

Secretaries of the Council

Ashot Manucharyan (1991-1994)
Gerard Libaridian (1994-1997)
Alexan Harutyunyan (1998-1999)
Serzh Sargsyan (1999-4 April 2007)
Armen Gevorgyan (6 June 2007-February 2008)
Artur Baghdasaryan (25 March 2008-30 April 2014)
Yuri Khatchaturov (3 October 2016-2 May 2017)
Armen Grigoryan (17 May 2018-Present)

International cooperation
On 4 May 2022, Secretary Armen Grigoryan met with the Prime Minister of Georgia Irakli Garibashvili. The sides discussed Armenia–Georgia relations and maintaining regional stability and security in the South Caucasus.

On 15 July 2022, Secretary Armen Grigoryan held a meeting with the Director of the Central Intelligence Agency, Willian Burns. The parties discussed the advancement of Armenia–United States relations.

On 29 September 2022, Secretary Armen Grigoryan met with the United States Assistant Secretary of Defense, Laura Cooper, at the United States Department of Defense. The sides discussed prospects for the development of bilateral relations.

On 4 October 2022, Secretary Armen Grigoryan met with the special representative of the NATO Secretary General in the Caucasus and Central Asia, Javier Colomina in Brussels.

Recent developments
On 14 October 2022, Secretary Armen Grigoryan endorsed the European Union Mission in Armenia as a way for the European Union to become a security guarantor in the region and confirmed Armenia's commitment to support the mission.

See also
 Government of Armenia
 Law of Armenia
 Politics of Armenia

References

External links
 Official Website

Government of Armenia
Military of Armenia
Armenia